Stol (Serbian Cyrillic: Стол) is a mountain in eastern Serbia, near the town of Bor. Its highest peak has an elevation of 1,156 meters above sea level. Like nearby Veliki Krš and Mali Krš, Stol has a number of pronounced karst formations. There is a mountain hut with around 35 beds, maintained by the mountaineering society "Crni vrh" from Bor.

Rock climbing on Stol 
Stol is a developed climbing spot, with 68 bolted routes, difficulties from 4c to 8a+.

References

External links
 Tamo gde se Boru vraća oduzeto, TK Info 

Bor, Serbia
Mountains of Serbia
Serbian Carpathians